Lorenzo Cabrera (born April 30, 1920), nicknamed "Chiquitín", is a Cuban former professional baseball player. He played between 1947 and 1956.

References

External links
 and Seamheads

1920 births
Possibly living people
New York Cubans players
Ottawa Giants players
Oakland Oaks (baseball) players
Port Arthur Sea Hawks players
Nogales Diablos Rojos players
Cuban expatriate baseball players in Canada
Cuban expatriate baseball players in the United States
Bryan/Del Rio Indians players
Cuban expatriate baseball players in Mexico
Diablos Rojos del México players
People from Cienfuegos
Cuban expatriate baseball players in Nicaragua